Asarum is a genus of plants in the birthwort family Aristolochiaceae, commonly known as wild ginger.

Asarum is the genitive plural of the Latin āsa (an alternate form of āra) meaning altar or sanctuary.

Description 
Asarum is a genus of low-growing herbs distributed across the temperate zones of the Northern Hemisphere, with most species in East Asia (China, Japan, and Vietnam) and North America, and one species in Europe. Biogeographically, Asarum originated in Asia.

They have characteristic kidney-shaped leaves, growing from creeping rhizomes, and bear small, axillary, brown or reddish flowers.

The plant is called wild ginger because the rhizome tastes and smells similar to ginger root, but the two are not particularly related. The FDA warns against consuming Asarum, as it is nephrotoxic and contains the potent carcinogen aristolochic acid.
 The birthwort family also contains the genus Aristolochia, known for carcinogens.

Wild ginger favors moist, shaded sites with humus-rich soil.  The deciduous, heart-shaped leaves are opposite, and borne from the rhizome which lies just under the soil surface.  Two leaves emerge each year from the growing tip.  The curious jug-shaped flowers, which give the plant an alternate name, little jug, are borne singly in spring between the leaf bases.

Wild ginger can easily be grown in a shade garden, and makes an attractive groundcover.

Taxonomy 
Traditionally, the genus Asarum was considered as a single genus with about 85 species. However, a trend exists among some botanists to segregate the genus into separate genera, based on considerations of chromosome number and floral morphology:
 Asarum sensu stricto (about 17 species), distributed in Asia (mainly China), North America, and Europe
 Heterotropa (about 50 species), distributed in Asia
 Asiasarum (three or four species), distributed in Asia
 Geotaenium (three or four species), distributed in Asia
 Hexastylis  (ten species), distributed in North America

Study of the internal transcribed spacer region (ITS) of nuclear ribosomal DNA, combined with morphological data, has yielded a better-resolved phylogenetic hypothesis,  supporting a recognition of two subgenera, Asarum and Heterotropa each containing two sections, rather than the segregated genera above.

Asarum sensu stricto (s.s.) : the North American species are monophyletic and are derived from within the paraphyletic Asian species group.

 Geotaenium is a sister to Asarum s.s., showing its close relationship to Asarum s.s..

 Asiasarum is a sister to the Hexastylis + Heterotropa clade, showing several synapomorphies with this clade.

 Hexastylis: this genus has been recognized solely on the study by H.L. Blomquist. However, the above-mentioned DNA study provided indications that Hexastylis is not monophyletic and that some species of Hexastylis are more closely related to Asiatic species of  Heterotropa than they are to other species of Hexastylis. The recognition of Hexastylis has likely persisted due to regional botanists' contrasting the morphology of that section with the regionally co-occurring Asarum canadense, which is the sole species of Asarum subgenus Asarum in the southeastern United States. However, the morphological character states used to support the recognition of section Hexastylis at the generic level are plesiomorphic. For example, Blomquist  provides an enumeration of character states supporting Hexastylis, all of are plesiomorphic with respect to one or another Asarum lineage. The presence of persistent, variegated leaves is often invoked by amateur botanists as a characteristic unique to section Hexastylis amongst North American Asarum species, however Asarum marmoratum, an Asarum Subgenus Asarum species found in the western United States also has persistent and variegated leaves (see Calflora page for detailed photographs)

 Heterotropa: this is a complex monophyletic group, well nested within the Asiasarum + Hexastylis + Heterotropa clade. 

.

Species

Uses 
Wild ginger can be cooked in the same fashion as ginger root, and can also be candied or used to make medicine.

References

External links 

List of Asarum species
The International Agency for Research on Cancer.

 
Piperales genera
Herbs